John Lorraine Sullivan  (30 March 1915 – 9 July 1990) was a New Zealand rugby union player, coach and administrator. A three-quarter and second five-eighth, Sullivan represented Taranaki at a provincial level, and was a member of the New Zealand national side, the All Blacks, from 1936 to 1938. He played nine matches for the All Blacks including six internationals.

Following World War II, during which he saw service overseas, Sullivan became a rugby union coach, selector and administrator.  He coached the Taranaki team during the late 1940s, the New Zealand under-23 side in 1958, and the All Blacks on their 1960 tour to South Africa. He was also a Taranaki selector, a North Island selector (1952–59) and a national selector (1954–60). Sullivan served on the New Zealand Rugby Union executive from 1962 to 1977, and was chairman between 1969 and 1977.

In 1977, Sullivan was awarded the Queen Elizabeth II Silver Jubilee Medal. In the 1978 New Year Honours, he was appointed a Commander of the Order of the British Empire, for services to rugby. He died in Wellington in 1990, and was buried in Te Henui Cemetery, New Plymouth.

References

1915 births
1990 deaths
New Zealand rugby union players
New Zealand international rugby union players
Taranaki rugby union players
Rugby union wings
Rugby union centres
New Zealand military personnel of World War II
New Zealand rugby union coaches
New Zealand national rugby union team coaches
New Zealand Rugby Football Union officials
New Zealand Commanders of the Order of the British Empire
Burials at Te Henui Cemetery